The Botanical Garden of São Paulo is a botanical garden in São Paulo, Brazil. The park spans a  area in the Fontes do Ipiranga State Park, in the district of Água Funda, in São Paulo's South zone, next to São Paulo Zoo. It houses the state's Botanical Institute. It was founded, in its current location, in 1928, by the botanist Frederico Carlos Hoehne.

History

Since 1893, the São Paulo state government began expropriations in order to preserve the sources of the Ipiranga River and the surrounding Atlantic Forest area. The year 1917 marks the founding of the State Park (Parque do Estado); sources were used until 1928 to supply water to the district of Ipiranga. The state park changed its name in 1969 and became the Parque Estadual Fontes do Ipiranga.

The botanical garden has the following plant varieties: orchids, ornamental plants, aquatic plants, mushrooms, palm trees, fruit trees, trees providing timber, plants of the family Gesneriaceae, Marantaceae and pteridophytes.

It counts among its facilities: the Botanical Museum of Dr. João Barbosa Rodrigues, the Jardim de Lineu (Garden of Linnaeus) and the mirror of water, greenhouses and the Dr. Frederico Carlos Hoehne orchidarium, Lago das Ninfeias (Lake of the Waterlilies), trails and sculptures.

In 2021, the park was granted to the private initiative for management for the next 30 years, together with the São Paulo Zoo and the Safari Zoo, after the Reserva Paulista Consortium won the bidding process. The concession right includes activities such as management, maintenance and infrastructure improvements, economic exploitation, environmental education and research support.

See also 
 List of botanical gardens in Brazil

References

External links

 

Botanical gardens in Brazil
Tourist attractions in São Paulo
Parks in São Paulo